Kandherpur is a village in Bareilly district in the state of Uttar Pradesh, India. This village is near Bisharatganj town.

Villages in Bareilly district